Dobrava pri Škocjanu is a settlement in the Municipality of Škocjan in southeastern Slovenia. It lies on the left bank of the Krka River on the regional road leading south from Škocjan to Šentjernej. Within the municipality, it belongs to the Village Community of Dobrava pri Škocjanu and Tomažja Vas. The area is part of the historical region of Lower Carniola. The municipality is now included in the Southeast Slovenia Statistical Region.

Name
The name of the settlement was changed from Dobrava to Dobrava pri Škocjanu in 1953. In the past the German name was Dobrawa.

References

External links
Dobrava pri Škocjanu at Geopedia

Populated places in the Municipality of Škocjan